Come True is a Canadian science fiction horror film written and directed by Anthony Scott Burns. The film stars Julia Sarah Stone and Landon Liboiron. The film plot follows a teenage runaway who takes part in a sleep study that becomes a nightmarish descent into the depths of her mind and a frightening examination of the power of dreams.

Plot
Sara Dunn is a young woman with a troubled relationship with her mother, whom she avoids for unknown reasons. Essentially homeless, she steals food from her mother’s house and sleeps in a sleeping bag outdoors or at friends’ homes. Her sleep environment affects her ability to stay awake in class and throughout the day. She is also plagued by strange, surreal nightmares of a dark maze and a shadowy figure with glowing eyes.

In need of money, Sara agrees to be a test subject in a sleep study, the intent and goal of which are classified. At first, Sara sleeps well but, after two sessions, her nightmares begin the worsen. She finds out one of the scientists, a young man nicknamed Riff, has been following her outside of the study, and she is troubled by the only other woman in the study, Emily, seemingly dropping out. Sara has a panic attack when one of the scientists shows her a picture of the same shadowy figure from her dreams, and she becomes fed up with the fact none of them will divulge the purpose of the study. The head scientist, Dr. Meyer, disallows the younger scientists using unapproved study methods because of what happened to Sara.

One day, after passing out from seeing a shadowy figure in a laundromat, Sara is robbed of her phone, so she confronts Riff, insisting that the study has had a negative impact on her and she will only continue as a test subject if he tells her the study’s purpose. He informs her the experiment involves monitoring subjects’ dreams using a brain scanning device that converts brainwaves into images.

During the next session, Sara and the rest of the experiment volunteers all dream of the same shadowy figure at the same time. Riff states that, across the world and throughout history, people have dreamed of a similar figure, which has also haunted him since childhood. As their vitals spike, Sara wakes up in a panic, bleeding from her left eye, and runs away after telling the other scientists she knows what they’re doing. Riff pursues her as she runs to a club in search of her friend Zoe but passes out, forcing him to carry her unconscious body.

Back at the lab, the two remaining volunteers continue dreaming of the shadow figure, and they becoming semiconscious from sleep paralysis, seeing the figure standing at the foot of their beds. The scientists are deeply unsettled as it moves around in the waking world. After one of the scientists go into the volunteers’ room, the figure reaches for him and the volunteers sit up awake with white eyes, causing the entire monitoring system to shut down.

Sara wakes up from a surreal nightmare involving the shadowy figure and finds herself in Riff’s apartment, where she discovers he straps himself to his bed and monitors his own dreams. She sees his dream sequence about her in which the two of them grow fangs and kiss. Then he has the same dream of the shadow figure as he enters sleep paralysis and Sara wakes him before it reaches him. Traumatized and exhausted, they end up having sex, during which Sara sees two shadow figures and passes out again, motivating Riff to take her to a hospital.

As Riff waits for a report of Sara's status, he begins to dream of a dark maze and a humanoid figure in the waking world. He then learns Sara has left her room and wandered out of the hospital. Riff realizes that she is sleepwalking and her eyes bleed when he tries to wake her. He calls his colleague, Anita, and urges her to help monitor Sara´s dreaming as she sleepwalks through the city.

Anita arrives and they attach a mobile monitor to Sara’s head as she unconsciously leads them to a remote, wooded area. Sara’s dream appears to mimic the path she’s taking, with shadowy figures manifesting on the monitor, seeming to flank the trio. As they enter a field, Riff finds a cellphone ringing in the grass. When he answers the phone call, Sara wakes up screaming.

Riff comforts Sara and she identifies the phone as hers despite the fact she has never been there before. The phone screen grows staticky and, though awake, Sara sees multiple shadow figures in the trees. The trio flee, but both Anita and Riff are swallowed by darkness as Sara is approached by a shadow figure.

Suddenly, Sara wakes up again in Riff’s apartment, naked and straddling Riff’s dead body, having apparently gouged out his eyes in a sleepwalking episode. She goes to the bathroom, where she receives a text message that makes her laugh and examines her reflection, discovering she has fangs.

The message says she has been in a coma for twenty years, as she is being studied using a new technique, and the scientists are not sure where in her dream the message will reach her. It begs her to wake up before the screen cuts to black.

Cast
 Julia Sarah Stone as Sarah
 Landon Liboiron as Jeremy
 Tiffany Helm as Old Woman
 Chantal Perron as Erin
 Tedra Rogers as Zoe
 Orin McCusker as Peter
 Carlee Ryski as Anita
 Millie Jayne as Washroom Girl

Release
Come True had its world premiere in Canada at the 2020 Fantasia Film Festival on August 30, 2020. It was released in select theaters and on VOD platforms on March 12, 2021 by IFC Midnight in America. No Canadian release has been announced.

Reception
 The website's critical consensus reads, "Well-acted and visually striking, Come True offers an eerily effective reminder of how the sleeping subconscious can be fertile ground for horror." On Metacritic, the movie received a score of 68 based on 17 reviews, indicating "generally favorable reviews".

The film received two Canadian Screen Award nominations at the 10th Canadian Screen Awards in 2022, for Best Director (Burns) and Best Actress (Stone).

References

External links
 
 
 Come True at Library and Archives Canada

2020 films
Canadian science fiction horror films
2020 science fiction horror films
Films about dreams
Canadian vampire films
IFC Films films
English-language Canadian films
2020s English-language films
2020s Canadian films
Copperheart Entertainment films